Rabbi David ben Aryeh Leib of Lida ( 1650 – 1696) wrote works of rabbinic literature, including Sefer Shomer Shabbat and books on the 613 Mitzvot, bris milah, the Shulchan Aruch, the Book of Ruth, and Jewish ethics (Divrei David, 1671).

He was accused of Sabbateanism, not to mention plagiarism, but was absolved of wrongdoing by the Council of the Four Lands. He died in Lviv (Lemberg).

Biography

His uncle (mother's brother) was the R. Moses Rivkes, author of "Be'er ha-Golah." Besides serving initially as the rabbi of Lida (for which he is named), he also functioned as the of Zwolin and Mainz. In 1682, he was appointed the Ashkenazi rabbi of Amsterdam.

According to the Jewish Encyclopedia: "The inscription on his tombstone bears the date 5450 = 1690, but Polak (see "Ḳol Bat Gallim," p. 3) proves this to be a mistake, as several works are extant which were endorsed by him after the year given in the inscription. Stern (see "Bikkurim," i., Preface, p. xxxvi.) gives Ḥeshwan, 5448, which may, however, be a misprint for 5458 = 1698."

Works
Be'er 'Eseḳ (The Well of Dispute), 1684
Divre David, a moral treatise
Ḥalluḳe Abanim (Smooth Stones), a commentary on Rashi to the Pentateuch (Fürth, 1693)
Ir Miḳlaṭ (The City of Refuge), a commentary on the 613 commandments (Dyhernfurth, 1690)
Migdal David (The Tower of David), a cabalistic commentary on Ruth (Amsterdam, 1680)
Berit Adonai (The Alliance of God), a treatise in Judæo-German on circumcision (Amsterdam, 1684)
Sod Adonai (The Secret of God), a treatise in Hebrew on circumcision, with a commentary entitled "Sharbiṭ ha-Zahab" (The Golden Scepter), written at Mainz in 1680, and published at Amsterdam 1694
Ir Dawid (The Town of David), a collection of homilies, edited by his son Pethahiah (Amsterdam, 1719)
Shir Hillulim (Wedding Song), a poem on the occasion of presenting a Sefer Torah scroll to the synagogue (Amsterdam, 1680)

Sources
 Encyclopaedia Judaica, V:1348

1650s births
1690s deaths
17th-century Polish rabbis